The 5th constituency of Marne (French: Cinquième circonscription de la Marne) is one of five electoral districts in the department of the same name, each of which returns one deputy to the French National Assembly in elections using the two-round system, with a run-off if no candidate receives more than 50% of the vote in the first round.

Description
The constituency – which covers the south-central and south-eastern parts of the department and includes the town of Vitry-le-François – is made up of the eleven former cantons of Anglure, Avize, Écury-sur-Coole, Fère-Champenoise, Heiltz-le-Maurupt, Saint-Remy-en-Bouzemont-Saint-Genest-et-Isson, Sompuis, Thiéblemont-Farémont, Vertus, Vitry-le-François-Est, and Vitry-le-François-Ouest.

At the time of the 1999 census (which was the basis for the most recent redrawing of constituency boundaries, carried out in 2010) the 5th constituency had a total population of 83,412.

The constituency has returned the centre-right politician Charles de Courson, currently a member of the Les Centristes, at every election since 1993.

Historic representation

Election results

2022 

 
 
|-
| colspan="8" bgcolor="#E9E9E9"|
|-

2017

2012

 
 
 
 
|-
| colspan="8" bgcolor="#E9E9E9"|
|-

Sources
Official results of French elections from 2002: "Résultats électoraux officiels en France" (in French).
Official results of French elections from 2017: "" (in French).

5